Propalticus is a genus of blister beetles in the family Propalticidae.  The genus was named and described by David Sharp in 1879.

Species

 Propalticus acupinctus (John, 1939)
 Propalticus africanus (John, 1956)
 Propalticus bryanti John, 1960
 Propalticus crassiceps John, 1960
 Propalticus cuneiformis John, 1960
 Propalticus decoomani John, 1960
 Propalticus discogenioides John, 1960
 Propalticus doddi John, 1960
 Propalticus dybasi John, 1960
 Propalticus indicus Sen Gupta, 1978
 Propalticus inflatus (John, 1943)
 Propalticus insularis John, 1960
 Propalticus jansoni Sharp, 1882
 Propalticus japonicus Nakane, 1966
 Propalticus jarawa Pal, 2008
 Propalticus kiuchii Sasaji, 1971
 Propalticus madagascariensis John, 1960
 Propalticus mixtocomatus (John, 1939)
 Propalticus morimotoi Kamiya, 1964
 Propalticus oculatus Sharp, 1879
 Propalticus ryukyuensis Kamiya, 1964
 Propalticus saipanensis John, 1960
 Propalticus santhomeae John, 1960
 Propalticus sarawakensis John, 1960
 Propalticus scriptitatus John, 1960
 Propalticus sechellarum Scott, 1922
 Propalticus sierraleonis John, 1960
 Propalticus simplex Crowson & Sen Gupta, 1969
 Propalticus striatus John, 1960
 Propalticus tonkinensis John, 1960
 Propalticus ulimanganus John, 1960
 Propalticus virgatus (John, 1939)
 Propalticus wainganus John, 1969

References

Propalticidae